Colonel Rex T. Barber  (May 6, 1917 – July 26, 2001) was a World War II fighter pilot from the United States. He is best known as a member of the top secret mission to intercept the aircraft carrying Japanese Admiral Isoroku Yamamoto in April 1943.

Personal life
Born and raised in Culver, Oregon, Barber's parents were Charlotte F. Barber and William C. Barber.  He was a student at Linfield College and then Oregon State College in Corvallis; he majored in agricultural engineering from 1937 to 1940 before enlisting in the U.S. Army Air Corps in September 1940.

Barber married Margaret I. Smith (February 11, 1918 – April 26, 2005) at Tyndall Field on October 3, 1947.  They had two sons, Rex Barber Jr. and Richard Barber.

Military service
Barber received his commission as a U.S. Army officer and his pilot's wings on October 31, 1941. He joined the 70th Pursuit Squadron, which arrived at Guadalcanal, Solomon Islands, in December 1942. Flying a Bell P-39 Airacobra, he scored his first victory by downing a Japanese bomber on the 28th. Upon transfer to the 339th Squadron, he began flying P-38 Lightnings and claimed two Zero fighters on April 7.

On April 18, Lieutenant Barber figured prominently in the Yamamoto interception, also known as Operation Vengeance. Intelligence sources had learned that Yamamoto would be flying in a "Betty" bomber on an inspection tour of Japanese bases in the northern Solomon Islands. Historian Donald P. Bourgeois credits Barber with the sole kill of Yamamoto's aircraft. In 1991, Barber and Captain Thomas George Lanphier, Jr. were officially credited with half a kill each in Yamamoto's bomber after the Air Force reviewed the incident. Barber also shared a second Betty destroyed on the same mission. In 2003, Barber was credited by the Governor and Legislature of Oregon with the sole kill after an inspection analyzed the crash site and determined the path of the bullet impacts, thereby validating Barber's account and invalidating Lanphier's claim. However, despite numerous appeals, the US Air Force refused to reverse its 1991 ruling giving each pilot half credit for the kill.

Lanphier also claimed to have shot down a Zero fighter during this mission, although Japanese records show that no Zeros were lost.

After his tour of duty ended in June 1943, then-Captain Barber requested a return to combat. Late that year, he joined the 449th Fighter Squadron in China, still flying P-38s. He claimed three further Japanese planes probably destroyed and damaged, but he was shot down on his 139th mission, bailing out near Kiukiang on April 29. He was rescued by Chinese civilians, who treated his injuries and escorted him to safety five weeks later. At the end of the war, Barber attained the rank of major and commanded one of America's first jet squadrons. He retired as a colonel in 1961.

Decorations

Navy Cross

Citation:
The President of the United States of America takes pleasure in presenting the Navy Cross to First Lieutenant (Air Corps) Rex Theodore Barber (ASN: 0-429902), United States Army Air Forces, for extraordinary heroism while serving as Pilot of a P-38 fighter airplane in the 339th Fighter Squadron, 37th Fighter Group, THIRTEENTH Air Force, U.S. Army Air Forces, attached to a Marine Fighter Command in action against enemy Japanese forces in the Solomon Islands on 18 April 1943. Participating in a dangerously long interception flight, First Lieutenant Barber contacted a formation of two enemy bombers escorted by six fighters in a complete surprise approach. Quickly engaging the enemy, he pressed his tactical advantage and struck fiercely, destroying one Japanese bomber at such close range that fragments from the explosion lodged in the wings of his plane, and shooting down the escorting enemy fighter plane which had been attempting to divert the attack. His brilliant airmanship and determined fighting spirit throughout a daring and vital mission were in keeping with the highest traditions of the United States Armed Services.

Commendations
Barber was awarded the following awards over his military career, including the Veterans of Foreign Wars Gold Medal of Merit.

Return to civilian life
Upon his retirement from the military, Barber returned to Culver, Oregon, and resided there for the next forty years. He worked as an insurance agent and, at different times, served the city of Culver as mayor and judge.

He was a strong supporter of Little League Baseball, and often helped out local youth. He was actively involved in service organizations until his death at his home in Terrebonne, Oregon. His son, Rex Jr., is quoted as saying that his "afterburner just flamed out on him."

60th anniversary of the Yamamoto shootdown
On April 18, 2003, Governor Ted Kulongoski proclaimed the day "Rex T. Barber Day." The previous week, the Oregon State Legislature had declared that the new bridge on U.S. Highway 97 over the Crooked River was to be named the Rex T. Barber Veterans Memorial Bridge in his honor. (This bridge replaced the Crooked River High Bridge.) The new bridge, plaque and kiosk honoring Barber were dedicated on August 9, 2003, at Peter Skene Ogden State Scenic Viewpoint.

References

 OSU's Famous Alumni
 Notable Oregonians: Rex T. BarberWWII Fighter Pilot and Ace from the Oregon Blue Book
 Get Yamamoto Burke Davis 1969.
 Lighting Over Bougainville R. Cargill Hall 1991
 Lighting Strike Donald A. Davis 2005

External links

 Text of Oregon Joint Resolution 38 (2003) honoring Barber from the Oregon Legislative Assembly
 456 FIS Rex T. Barber
 

1917 births
2001 deaths
United States Army Air Forces pilots of World War II
Recipients of the Navy Cross (United States)
Recipients of the Silver Star
Oregon State University alumni
People from Jefferson County, Oregon
Isoroku Yamamoto
Recipients of the Air Medal
Mayors of places in Oregon
20th-century American politicians
Linfield University people
People from Deschutes County, Oregon
United States Air Force colonels